Anthonette Christine Cayedito  (born December 25, 1976) is a Native American girl who disappeared from her home in Gallup, New Mexico, on April 6, 1986. Although law enforcement officials believe her to be deceased, she is still officially listed as a missing person and her case remains open.

Background
Cayedito was born on December 25, 1976, to Penny Cayedito (1952–1999), of the Navajo Nation, and Anthony Montoya (1951–2012), a father of Italian and Hispanic descent. After her parents' separation, Anthonette and her younger sisters, Wendy and Senida were raised by their mother in Gallup, New Mexico.

Anthonette was described as being level headed, wise beyond her years, scholastically dedicated, friendly, caring, and dependable. By the time she was six years old, she was cooking for her sisters, ironed their clothes for the week, and played a vital role in caring for them. She was known by her peers for her displayed concern for the well-being of others, particularly if they were downcast or otherwise in need. Her youngest sister later described Anthonette as having a "caregiver's heart". Her favorite color was purple, she enjoyed listening to the music of Michael Jackson and Ronnie Milsap, and she was nicknamed "Squirrel".

She was a fourth grade student at Lincoln Elementary School, where she was an attentive, above-average student who displayed a flair for sports and physical activities, winning the Presidential Fitness award in her fourth year. Outside of school, Cayedito also displayed strong interest in her weekly Bible studies, and was devoted to her religious faith. At the time of her disappearance, she was living with her mom and sisters at 204 Arnold Circle #9, Gallup, New Mexico.

Disappearance
Cayedito disappeared from her home in Gallup, New Mexico, in the early morning hours of April 6, 1986. That evening, Cayedito's mother, Penny, had been out with friends at a local bar, and Anthonette, along with her younger sisters Wendy and Sadie, were with a babysitter. Penny arrived home around midnight and sent the babysitter home.

The following morning, when Penny awoke to prepare the girls for Bible school, she realized Anthonette was not in her bedroom. After inquiring with neighbors, she phoned police.

Five years after the disappearance, Wendy - now aged 10 - gave her account of the events of the night for the first time. According to Wendy, there had been a knock on the door around 3 a.m. Both of the girls were still awake, and Anthonette answered the door. When she asked who was there, the knocker identified himself as "Uncle Joe". When she opened the door, she was grabbed by two men. kicking and screaming "Let me go! Let me go!", the men forced her into a brown van. Wendy didn't recognize the men; she didn't get a look at their faces.  Wendy stated that she had not said anything at the time owing to a fear of upsetting her mother, and of not being believed.

Alleged sightings

One year after Cayedito's disappearance, the Gallup Police Department received a frantic phone call in which a young girl claimed to be Anthonette Cayedito; in the call, she said she was in Albuquerque, New Mexico. Before the girl could reveal her whereabouts, an angry adult voice was heard shouting, "Who said you could use the phone?!" followed by the girl screaming and the sounds of a scuffle, and the phone call was then cut off. Cayedito's mother, Penny, believed the voice to be her daughter's, but did not recognize the adult's voice.

Four years later, in 1991, a waitress at a restaurant in Carson City, Nevada, encountered a teenage girl matching Cayedito's description in the company of an unkempt couple. The girl continuously knocked her utensils to the floor, seemingly attempting to get the waitress's attention. According to the waitress, the girl grabbed her hand and squeezed it firmly each time the waitress handed back the utensils. After they left, the waitress cleaned their table and found a napkin under the plate the girl had been eating from. It contained two brief messages: "Help Me" and "Call the Police", written on it.

Theories
Police interviewed an uncle who was married to Penny's sister, but declined to name him a suspect. Investigators believe Cayedito may be deceased, although her whereabouts remain unknown . Theories range from her being either a victim of homicide or possibly human trafficking. Her mother, Penny, died on April 18, 1999, from a combination of liver cirrhosis and cardiac issues aged 46; in 2016 police stated they believed Penny may have had more information than she had given police concerning her daughter's disappearance, citing a failed lie detector test. Anthonette's father, Anthony, died on August 17, 2012.

Aftermath

Three years after Cayedito's disappearance, her 25-year-old disabled step aunt, Louisa Estrada (sister to Larry Estrada), disappeared on September 5, 1989, from Gallup. Unlike Anthonette, Louisa was found alive in Juarez, Mexico a month later and returned home. Over the years there have been questions over potential connections between the two cases.

In a 2016 interview with the Albuquerque Journal, Wendy Montoya, Anthonette's youngest sister (who was five at the time of the her sister's abduction), spoke of the struggles that she and her family went through. "It just broke my whole family up. It was a very dark and dysfunctional time." Montoya revealed that she and her mother could barely talk about Anthonette without crying, and then without drinking and getting high. "That was how we coped with the pain, to numb it, not to forget about it but to put it on the shelf, you know?"

The trauma of losing her sister lead Montoya into a life of drug addiction, alcoholism, gang affiliation, and acquiring a criminal record throughout her adolescence into her young adulthood. Her lifestyle inevitably caused her to lose custody of her children to the state. Around 2007, Montoya successfully turned her life around. "I went into rehab. I struggled to get my kids back, struggled to get away from the old person I was, to break the cycle I was raised up in, and to get far away from here. And I did it." She further added that if she could not find her sister, she could at least find herself.

As of 2016, Wendy is reported to reside in Bakersfield, California, where she leads a private and productive life with her own family and career. Montoya admits that although her memories of Anthonette are vague (due to the fact that her sister was taken when she was five), the loss still haunts her and she misses her to this day. For Wendy, Anthonette is indelibly frozen in time "at age 9, a little girl with a jumble of teeth, soft brown eyes and a caregiver's heart." Montoya still maintains hope that her sister is somewhere out there, and there is still time to discover the truth of what became of her. Furthermore, stating "I'm not going to accept that she's dead. I need proof."

In June 2022, Anthonette’s other sister, Sadie Acevedo, was interviewed by KOAT-TV. She stated “It's hard not knowing the point of no closure. What happened? Where did she go?”. In the interview, Acevedo also publicly conveyed a message to her missing sister, “She's safe. She has a family that loves her. She has sisters. We haven't given up. We all wonder and often think about Anthonette and what's she doing? Does she have kids? What kind of life is she living?”.

Media depictions
Cayedito's disappearance was featured on an episode of Unsolved Mysteries. The episode aired on December 16, 1992, nine days before what would've been Anthonette's sixteenth birthday.

Unidentified persons exclusions
According to the National Missing and Unidentified Persons System, the following decedents were ruled out as being the remains of Cayedito.

See also
List of people who disappeared
Missing and murdered Indigenous women

References

External links
 

1980s missing person cases
1986 in New Mexico
April 1986 events in the United States
Kidnapped American children
Missing person cases in New Mexico
Missing American children
Gallup, New Mexico
Incidents of violence against girls
Native American history of New Mexico